Latzke is a German surname, which is derived from the Slavic given name Ladislaw, a variant of László. 

The name may refer to:

Felix Latzke (born 1942), Austrian footballer and manager
Rainer Maria Latzke (born 1950), German artist

See also
Latz

References

German-language surnames